The history of Arizona during World War II begins in 1940, when the United States government began constructing military bases within the state in preparation for war. Arizona's contribution to the Allied war effort was significant both in terms of manpower and facilities supported in the state. Prisoner of war camps were operated at Camp Florence and Papago Park, and there was an internment camp to house Japanese-Americans, most of them citizens, who had been forcibly deported from the West Coast.

The war years provided great economic stimulus, both because of the numbers of troops at camps in the state, and increase in demand, and the expansion of wartime demand for such materials as copper and other metals. Industries expanded, adding to the state's recovery from the Great Depression.

Hispanics
During the war, Mexican-American community organizations promoted efforts to support American troops abroad. They worked both to support the war effort materially and to provide moral support for young American men fighting the war, especially their young Mexican-American men from local communities. Some community projects were cooperative between Anglo and Hispanic communities, but most were localized within the Mexican-American community. Mexican-American women also organized to assist their servicemen and the war effort; an underlying goal of Tucson's Spanish-American Mothers and Wives Association was the reinforcement of the woman's role in Spanish-Mexican culture. Members raised thousands of dollars, wrote letters, and joined in numerous celebrations of their culture and their support for Mexican-American servicemen. Membership reached more than 300 during the war. The organization stopped operating in 1976.

Casualties

Prisoner of war camps

Arizona's Camp Florence, on the Florence Military Reservation, was the first permanent alien enemy camp constructed during World War II. Construction began during 1942 to house 3000 internees, with room to expand to 6000. The initial construction budget was $4.8 million. The United States did not detain numerous enemy aliens here, so the Army used Camp Florence as a POW camp.

Gallery

See also

 American Theater (World War II)
 Battle of Ambos Nogales
 Bisbee Riot
 Fort Lawton Riot
 Military history of the United States during World War II
 Nevada during World War II
 New Mexico during World War II
 Arizona World War II Army Airfields

References

1940s in Arizona
History of Arizona
Military history of Arizona
Arizona
Economy of Arizona
Wars fought in Arizona